Ahmet Ferruh Bozbeyli (21 January 1927 – 28 July 2019) was a Turkish politician who served as the speaker of Turkish parliament and the chairman of the Democratic party.

Early life
Born in Pazarcık of Kahramanmaraş Province in 1927. His father’s name was Sıddık. His mother died during his birth. After his elementary education in his home town and secondary education  in Antakya in 1947, he travelled to Istanbul for university. He finished the law school of Istanbul University in 1957 and he began serving as an attorney. During the Yassıada trials he was one of the attorneys who defended the former Democrat Party politicians.

Parliament speaker
In 1961, he became a member of the newly founded Justice Party (AP) and in the elections held on 15 December 1961 he was elected as an MP from Istanbul Province.  During his second term between 1965–1969 he was elected as the speaker of the Turkish parliament. He kept this position in his third term after 1969.

Democratic Party
In AP Bozbeyli was a part of a group known as the supporters of the pre-1960 Democrat Party politicians. They accused AP leadership of being uninterested in the political rights of the former politicians.  In 1970 October Ferruh Bozbeyli resigned from his post in the parliament administration.  One month later he also resigned with 40 other MPs (so-called 41s) from his party to form a new party. They founded Democratic Party (DP) on 18 December 1970 and Ferruh Bozbeyli became the chairman of the new party.

1973 and 1977
In the Presidential elections of 1973 held in the parliament, he was the candidate of his party. But he couldn't get any support other than that of his own party and consequently he lost the election. In the general elections held on 14 October 1973 in which he was reelected as an MP from Istanbul Province,  DP received 11.9% of votes and sent 45 representatives to the lower house of the parliament. (It was the third party in terms of the vote percentage and fourth party in terms of the number of representatives.) But after 1973 the party began losing support and in the elections held on 5 June 1977 DP was severely defeated. Even Bozbeyli was unable to be elected. After this defeat Bozbeyli resigned from his post in the party and quit from politics on 18 December 1978.

Later life
In later years he served in the board of directors of Türkiye İş Bankası and between 1990–1992 he was the chairman of the board. He wrote the following books:
Türkiye'de Siyasal Partilerin Ekonomik ve Sosyal Görüşleri (1969, "Social and political programs of the political parties in Turkey") 
Demokratik Sağ (1976, "Democratic Right")
Politika Sanatı (1980 "Art of Politics")
 Yalnız Demokrat  (2009, "Lonely Democrat", memoirs)

Death
He died in an Ankara hospital in which he was treated for kidney and lung diseases. He was interred at Turkish State Cemetery in Ankara after a state funeral was held one day later.

References

People from Pazarcık
1927 births
2019 deaths
Justice Party (Turkey) politicians
20th-century Turkish politicians
Istanbul University Faculty of Law alumni
Speakers of the Parliament of Turkey
Burials at Turkish State Cemetery
Deputy Speakers of the Grand National Assembly of Turkey